Very Old Barton  is a Kentucky Straight Bourbon Whiskey produced in Bardstown, Kentucky and aged 4 or 6 years by the Sazerac Company at its Barton Distillery. It is bottled in 80-, 86-, 90- and 100-proof (US) expressions.  The 100-proof expression was once age stated at 6 years and bottled-in-bond, but those designations have been progressively removed as they have moved to blending younger whiskey.  Tasting notes:  "Rich, tawny amber hue.  Lean woody aroma.  A firm attack leads to a medium bodied palate with a drying woody character.  Dry, warm finish."

Jim Murray's Whisky Bible has given Very Old Barton 80 Proof a 90.5 rating.  On February 16, 2011, Very Old Barton 100 Proof tied with Evan Williams "Black Label" as "Best Buy Whisk(e)y of the Year" in the 17th Annual Whisky Advocate Whisky Awards.

External links
 Official site for Very Old Barton
 Official site for Barton Brands

References

Bourbon whiskey
Sazerac Company brands
Bardstown, Kentucky